The Armstrong, Beere and Hime panorama is an almost complete panorama of the city of Toronto taken in 1856–1857 by the firm Armstrong, Beere and Hime. They are the earliest known photographs of the city of Toronto, and create an almost complete record of the city at that time. A fictionalized history of the photographs and their story plays a central role in Michael Redhill's Consolation.

They were created by the firm Armstrong, Beere and Hime under contract from the city of Toronto. In 1857 the British Colonial Office was deciding which city should be made the capital of The Canadas. As part of their bid, the city of Toronto elected to present a set of photographs of the city to the authorities in London.  The city paid Armstrong, Beere and Hime £60 to create four copies of 25 pictures. The panoramic images were taken from the roof of the Rossin House Hotel, at the southeast corner of King and York streets.

Toronto's bid to become the capital failed, and the photographs were lost and forgotten. They were rediscovered on October 9, 1979, when archivist Joan Schwartz located them when looking through records at the Colonial Office Library. Subsequently, a second set of the pictures was found in Ottawa.

A set of modern duplicates, reproduced from copy negatives, was presented to the City of Toronto as a Sesquicentennial (150th anniversary) gift from the British government in 1984. These are housed in the City of Toronto Archives.

The images

There were 25 pictures taken in total. 13 make up the almost complete panorama of the city, others were taken of various prominent buildings.

See also
Edwin Whitefield's 1854 lithograph of Toronto

External links
Toronto Archives - The Earliest Known Photographs of Toronto
City of Toronto Archives : Fonds 1498

History of Toronto
Black-and-white photographs
1857 works
1850s photographs